Inna Sheshkil (born June 20, 1971) is a Kazakhstani biathlete. She was born in Makinsk. She represented Kazakhstan at the 1994 Winter Olympics in Lillehammer, where she placed fourth in the 7.5 km sprint, 5 seconds from gold. In this race she fell 3 metres before the finishline, and probably lost something that could have been a gold medal. She also competed at the 1998 Winter Olympics in Nagano.

References

1971 births
Living people
Kazakhstani female biathletes
Olympic biathletes of Kazakhstan
Biathletes at the 1994 Winter Olympics
Biathletes at the 1998 Winter Olympics
Asian Games medalists in biathlon
Biathletes at the 1996 Asian Winter Games
People from Akmola Region
Medalists at the 1996 Asian Winter Games
Asian Games gold medalists for Kazakhstan
Asian Games silver medalists for Kazakhstan